Banseok station is a station of the Daejeon Metro Line 1 in Banseok-dong, Yuseong District, Daejeon, South Korea.

External links
  Banseok station from Daejeon Metropolitan Express Transit Corporation

Daejeon Metro stations
Yuseong District
Railway stations opened in 2007